The smooth snake (Coronella austriaca) is a species of non-venomous snake in the family Colubridae. The species is found in northern and central Europe, but also as far east as northern Iran. The Reptile Database recognizes two subspecies as being valid, including the nominotypical subspecies described here.

Description

The head has a rostral scale that is at least as deep as it is wide, creating a triangular indentation between the internasal scales (rarely separating them). The top of the head is covered with nine large plates. The nasal scale is often divided. There is one (rarely two) preoculars and two postoculars. The temporals number 2+2 or 2+3 (rarely 1+2) . There are seven (rarely eight) upper labials, of which the third and fourth or fourth and fifth border the eye.

In the middle part of the body there are 19 (rarely 17 or 21) rows of dorsal scales. In contrast with many other snakes found in the region, these scales are flat (not keeled).  This gives the snake a smooth texture to the touch, from which it gets its common name.  The ventral scales number 150-164 in males and 162–200 in females. The anal scale is divided (rarely single) and the subcaudal scales are paired. Males have 54–70 subcaudal scales and females 40–76.

The colour pattern consists of a brown, grey or reddish ground colour with two rows of small, rather indistinct dark spots running down the back towards the tail. In some cases, each pair of spots may be united toward the neck area, forming a series of cross-bars over the back. There is also a very indistinct series of dark spots running along each of the flanks. These four series of spots along the body overlay four parallel, rather shadowy stripes that also run down the back and flanks.

On the top of the head is a dark marking which is often in the shape of a crown, giving rise to the generic name Coronella (which means coronet). A relatively thick dark stripe extends from each nostril, through the eye, and along the side of the head to a little beyond the neck. The upper labials are whitish, greyish-white or light brown, sometimes with darker spots. The tongue is reddish brown or dark red.

Biology
The smooth snake feeds on smaller animals, especially other reptiles. It subdues larger prey by constriction, although unlike true constrictors it does not kill by this method.  Smooth snakes are ovoviviparous. The juveniles hatch out of eggs internally and are born live.

In Britain it is restricted to heathland habitats.

Geographic range
Coronella austriaca is found from the south of England through France and the Low Countries to northern Spain and Portugal, Germany, Norway and Sweden (as far north as latitude 63°), Latvia, Lithuania, Estonia,  Switzerland, Austria, Italy and Sicily (but not in Corsica or Sardinia), the western Balkans and Greece, and European Russia as far north as latitude 57°. In Asia, it is found from Turkey to Azerbaijan, Georgia, Armenia and northern Iran. It is oddly absent in Denmark despite the species being found just south of the German border as well as southern Sweden. The species is only known from Denmark from 6 specimens, all found between 1870 and 1914.

In Finland, the species is found only in Åland, and it is not common there.

Subspecies

See also
List of reptiles of Europe

References

Further reading
Arnold EN, Burton JA (1978). A Field Guide to the Reptiles and Amphibians of Britain and Europe. (With 351 illustrations, 257 in colour by D.W. Ovenden). London: Collins. 272 pp. + Plates 1-40. . (Coronella austriaca, pp. 204–205 + Plate 38, figure 1 + Map 117).
Boulenger GA (1894). Catalogue of the Snakes in the British Museum (Natural History). Volume II., Containing the Conclusion of the Colubridæ Aglyphæ. London: Trustees of the British Museum (Natural History). (Taylor and Francis, printers). xi + 382 pp. + Plates I-XX. (Coronella austriaca, pp. 191–193).
Laurenti JN (1768). Specimen medicum, exhibens synopsin reptilium emendatam cum experimentis circa venena et antidota reptilium austriacorum. Vienna: "Joan. Thom. Nob. de Trattnern". 214 pp. + Plates I-V. (Coronella austriaca, new species, p. 84 + Plate V, figure 1). (in Latin).
Malkmus R (1995). "Coronella austriaca acutirostris subspec. nov. aus dem Nordwesten der Iberischen Halbinsel (Reptilia: Serpentes: Colubridae) ". Zoologische Abhandlungen, Museum für Tierkunde Dresden 48 (3): 265-278. (Coronella austriaca acutirostris, new subspecies). (in German).

Gallery

External links

Smooth snake (Coronella austriaca) at Surrey Amphibian and Reptile Group (SARG). Accessed 5 June 2008.
Coronella austriaca at Amphibians and Reptiles of Europe. Accessed 7 October 2006.
Smooth snake (Coronella austriaca) at ARKive. Accessed 7 October 2006.
Smooth Snake – Coronella austriaca at Reptiles and Amphibians of the UK. Accessed 7 October 2006.
Smooth snake, Coronella austriaca at Reptiles & Amphibians of France. Accessed 30 October 2006.
Coronella austriaca at Checklist of Armenia's Amphibians and Reptiles, Tadevosyan's Herpetological Resources. Accessed 30 March 2007.
Smooth Snake at Blog posting with two pictures of Coronella austriaca. Accessed 18 July 2007.
Smooth snake (Coronella austriaca) at Dissertation abstract about smooth snakes mimicry of vipers being a protective behavior, scaring off some predators.  Accessed 15 July 2014
IUCN Red List

Colubrids
Snakes of Asia
Reptiles of Europe
Reptiles of Azerbaijan
Reptiles of Russia
Fauna of the United Kingdom
Reptiles described in 1768
Taxa named by Josephus Nicolaus Laurenti